Gjegjan is a village and a former municipality in the Shkodër County, northern Albania. At the 2015 local government reform it became a subdivision of the municipality Pukë. The population at the 2011 census was 2,846.

References

Administrative units of Pukë
Former municipalities in Shkodër County
Villages in Shkodër County